Lucrezia Fabretti (born 5 November 2001) is an Italian lifesaving athlete.
She is the current open and youth world record holder in the 100m manikin carry with fins. She is also a bronze medalist at the 2022 World Games in lifesaving.

See also
List of world records in life saving

References

2001 births
Living people
Competitors at the 2022 World Games
World Games bronze medalists
Italian lifesaving athletes
21st-century Italian women